Willeford is a surname. Notable people with the surname include:

Charles Willeford (1919–1988), American writer
Pamela Willeford (born 1950), U.S. diplomat
Thomas Willeford (born 1964), American artist and writer
Stephen Willeford, figure in the 2017 Sutherland Springs church shooting

See also
Wilford (surname)